The 2022 Asian Artistic Gymnastics Championships was the ninth edition of the Asian Artistic Gymnastics Championships, and were held in Doha, Qatar from 15 to 28 June 2022.

Medal summary

Men

Women

Medal table

World Championships qualification
This event served as qualification for the 2022 World Championships in Liverpool.  The top five men's teams (China, Japan, Chinese Taipei, South Korea, and Kazakhstan) and top four women's teams (China, South Korea, Japan, and Chinese Taipei) qualified a full team to compete.  As for individual qualification, the top six men and top eight women in the all-around standings not part of a qualified team qualified as an individual (a max of two gymnasts per country).  The top six men were Carlos Yulo (Philippines), Mahdi Ahmad Kohani (Iran), Abdulla Azimov (Uzbekistan), Khabibullo Ergashev (Uzbekistan), Yogeshewar Singh (India), and Gaurav Kumar (India).  The top eight women were Aida Bauyrzhanova (Kazakhstan), Rifda Irfanaluthfi (Indonesia), Milka Gehani (Sri Lanka), Dildora Aripova (Uzbekistan), Nadine Joy Nathan (Singapore), Ominakhon Khalilova (Uzbekistan), Korkem Yerbossynkyzy (Kazakhstan), and Sasiwimon Mueangphuan (Thailand).

Men's results

Individual all-around

Floor

Pommel horse

Rings

Vault

Parallel bars

Horizontal bar

References 

Asian Artistic Gymnastics Championships
Asian Gymnastics Championships
International gymnastics competitions hosted by Qatar
2022 in Qatari sport
Asian Artistic Gymnastics Championships